Gomon is a town in southern Ivory Coast. It is a sub-prefecture of Sikensi Department in Agnéby-Tiassa Region, Lagunes District.

Gomon was a commune until March 2012, when it became one of 1126 communes nationwide that were abolished.

In 2021, the population of the sub-prefecture of Gomon was 34,865.

Villages
The 4 villages of the sub-prefecture of Gomon and their population in 2014 are:
 Gomon I (9 843)
 Gomon Ii (1 535)
 Sahuyé (5 243)
 Yaobou (4 259)

References

Sub-prefectures of Agnéby-Tiassa
Former communes of Ivory Coast